María Luisa Larraga Cacho (born December 10, 1970 in Zaragoza) is a Spanish runner who specializes in the 10,000 metres.

Achievements

Personal bests
1500 metres - 4:23.5 min (2000)
3000 metres - 8:59.35i min (2002)
5000 metres - 15:28.78 min (1998)
10,000 metres - 31:45.85 min (2002)
Half marathon - 1:11:30 hrs (1998)
Marathon - 2:30:11 hrs (2001)

References

http://www.rfea.es/biografias/mujeres/larragaluisa.pdf

1970 births
Living people
Spanish female long-distance runners
Spanish female cross country runners
Spanish female marathon runners
Sportspeople from Zaragoza